Hoeffer House, also known as the Hoeffler Residence, in Syracuse, New York, was listed on the National Register of Historic Places in 1997.  It was designed by Ward Wellington Ward and was built in 1923.

It was listed for its architecture.

References

Houses in Syracuse, New York
National Register of Historic Places in Syracuse, New York
Houses on the National Register of Historic Places in New York (state)
Houses completed in 1923